The Sherwood Park Crusaders are a junior A ice hockey team in the Alberta Junior Hockey League (AJHL). They play in Sherwood Park, Alberta, Canada, with home games at Sherwood Park Arena Sports Centre.

History
The Edmonton Crusaders joined the Alberta Junior Hockey League (AJHL) in 1976 playing out of the Jasper Place Arena. The AJHL franchise was revived from a dormant entry controlled by Jim McCaddie. The Edmonton Crusaders played two seasons in the AJHL.

In 1978, a group of Sherwood Park businessmen, headed by John Fisher, Frank Chase, and Al Bishop, moved the franchise to Sherwood Park. John Fisher, a Sherwood Park resident and former Alberta Oilers' player, became the first coach of the Crusaders.

During a game on February 21, 1980, twenty-year-old captain Trevor Elton was hit cleanly along the boards by a player on the St. Albert Saints in St. Albert, Alberta.  Elton landed and went into convulsions and died later that night while in hospital. The 1980–81 team was coached by Gregg Pilling, and finished first place in the South Division.

During the 1985–86 season, Brett Pearce suffered a major injury which left him paralyzed. During the same season, the Crusaders capture the AJHL North Division championship. In 1986–87, the Crusaders won their first regular season championship, followed by another division title in 1989–90. The Crusaders made it the league playoff finals in 1985, 1986, and 1990, but never won the playoff championship. On July 2, 1996, Crusaders' general manager and part owner, Al McDonald died from cancer.

At the conclusion of the 1998 season, the team was purchased from Art Cox by a group of local businessmen headed by Tom Maxwell. The group has since turned the club into a non-profit society. The 1998–99 season had the team finish in last place in the North Division with a 13–44–3–2 record. In 1999, the entire team was rebuilt with mostly younger players and finished with a 7–52–3–2 record, the worst Junior A record in the 1999–2000 Canadian Junior Hockey League season.

The 2000–01 season had a new head coach in Doug Schum and qualified for the playoffs with a 20–29–6–2 record before losing to St. Albert Saints in three games. The Crusaders lost only five players going into the 2001–02 season and replaced Schum with head coach Dan Auchenberg. The team started slow in the season and then went on a 15-game winning streak to finish third in the North Division. Head coach Dan Auchenberg won the AJHL's Coach of the Year for the team's turnaround. They then swept their first round playoff series against the Lloydminster Blazers before a losing to the Drayton Valley Thunder in six games.

The team continued its improvement winning their four of their first five games before returning goaltender, Chris Denman, was injured and the team began trading for and rotating many goaltenders, including female goaltender Shannon Szabados for eight games. Szabados, who would later play for the Canadian women's national team for over a decade, earned two shutouts and a 7–1 record. The Crusaders finished the season with 43 wins, earning a first place finish in the North Division and the regular season title. In the first round of the playoffs, the Bonnyville Pontiacs were swept in four games. The playoff format for that season gave the team a second round bye and a 19-day layoff. The team then lost to the St. Albert Saints in five games in the division finals.

In the 2003–04 season, the team lost several of their veteran players, but head coach Auchenberg and goaltender Szabados returned. The team finished the season in fourth place in the North Division and were swept out of the playoffs in the first round by Drayton Valley.

Season-by-season record
Note: GP = Games played, W = Wins, L = Losses, T/OTL = Ties/Overtime losses, SOL = Shootout losses, Pts = Points, GF = Goals for, GA = Goals against

NHL alumni
The following former Crusaders have gone on to play in the NHL:

Matt Berlin
Steve Dykstra
Jim Ennis
Scott Ferguson
Ron Fischer
Chris Forbes
Nick Holden
Matt Kassian
Stu Kulak
Greg Pankewicz
Paxton Schulte
Sam Steel
Garry Valk
Ed Ward

The following former Crusaders have gone on to play for the Canada national women's ice hockey team:
Shannon Szabados

Retired numbers and honored personnel
Al McDonald: General manager and part owner died from cancer on July 2, 1996. The Sherwood Park Crusaders have placed a banner in his memory in the Sherwood Park Arena and dedicated a trophy for a Crusaders' player that best combines academic and athletic excellence each season.
#10 Trevor Elton: Captain of the Crusaders during the 1979–80 season. In February 1980 during a game against the St. Albert Saints, he was on the receiving end of a body check. Trevor collapsed and later died as a result of the hit. Elton's number was retired and a banner was placed in the arena to honour him. The Crusaders named the team's most valuable player trophy after him.
#11 Brett Pearce:  In 1985, Pearce won the Crusaders' Most Improved Player award and an accident during a game the following season paralyzed him. Pearce's number was retired and a banner was placed in the arena to honour him. The Crusaders renamed the team's Most Improved Player trophy after him.

See also
 List of ice hockey teams in Alberta

References

External links
Sherwood Park Crusaders website
Alberta Junior Hockey League website

Alberta Junior Hockey League teams
Sherwood Park
Ice hockey clubs established in 1978
1978 establishments in Alberta